Mihály Kovács (born 10 September 1957 in Budapest) is a Hungarian former handball player. He participated on three World Championships between 1982 and 1990, and won silver medal at the 1986 World Championship. He also played at the 1988 Summer Olympics, where the Hungarian national team placed fourth.

Awards
 Hungarian Handballer of the Year: 1985, 1986

References

1957 births
Living people
Handball players from Budapest
Hungarian male handball players
Olympic handball players of Hungary
Handball players at the 1988 Summer Olympics